Norden railway station may refer to 
Norden railway station (England)
Norden railway station (Germany)